Family with sequence similarity 49, member A, also known as FAM49A, is a protein which in humans is encoded by the FAM49A gene.

Gene 

Fam49A is located on human chromosome 2, at 2p24.3. It has 1512 base pairs in the reference sequence mRNA transcript.

Protein 

The Fam49A gene product is a 323 amino acid protein. The protein contains two domains: Residues 15-319 comprise the "Domain of Unknown Function 1394" (DUF1394). Residues 67->281 comprise the "Cytoplasmic Fragile X Interacting Superfamily" region.

References

Further reading